The Acrospermaceae are a family of fungi in the order Acrospermales.

References

 
Dothideomycetes families
Taxa named by Karl Wilhelm Gottlieb Leopold Fuckel
Taxa described in 1870